Gooderstone is a village situated in the Breckland District of Norfolk and covers an area of  with an estimated population of 390 in 2007, reducing to 363 at the 2011 Census.

The villages name means "Guthere's farm/settlement".

Gooderstone is served by St George's Church in the Benefice of Cockley Cley.

Gooderstone Primary School also serves the villages of Foulden and Oxborough.

Gooderstone Water Gardens and Nature Trail is open daily throughout the year.

References

http://kepn.nottingham.ac.uk/map/place/Norfolk/Gooderstone

Villages in Norfolk
Breckland District
Civil parishes in Norfolk